The 1911 Wabash Little Giants football team represented Wabash College during the 1911 college football season.  In College Football Hall of Fame inductee Jesse Harper's 3rd season at Wabash, the Little Giants compiled a 3–3–1 record, and outscored their opponents 50 to 43.

Schedule

References

Wabash
Wabash Little Giants football seasons
Wabash Little Giants football